Carol Ann Doda (August 29, 1937November 9, 2015) was an American topless dancer based in San Francisco, California, who was active from the 1960s through the 1980s. She was the first public topless dancer in the United States.

In 1964, Doda made international news, first by dancing topless at the city's Condor Club, then by enlarging her bust from size 34 to 44 through silicone injections. A year later, she was arrested along with the owners of the Condor Club, but all three of them were later cleared of charges. Her breasts became known as Doda's "twin 44s" and "the new Twin Peaks of San Francisco".

Early life

Carol Ann Doda was born August 29, 1937, in Vallejo, California, and grew up in San Francisco. Her mother's maiden name was Hoss. Her parents divorced when she was three, and Doda dropped out of school and became a cocktail waitress at age 14.

Topless entertainer

Doda attended the San Francisco Art Institute and worked as a waitress and lounge entertainer at the Condor Club, at the corner of Broadway and Columbus in the North Beach section of San Francisco. Doda's act began with a grand piano being lowered from the ceiling by hydraulic motors; Doda would be atop the piano dancing,
as it descended from a hole in the ceiling.  She go-go danced "The Swim" to a rock and roll combo headed by Bobby Freeman as her piano settled on the stage.  (In 1983 Assistant Manager James "Jimmy the Beard" Ferrozzo was crushed to death by the hydraulic piano while lying atop his naked stripper girlfriend, Theresa Hill.)  From the waist up Doda emulated aquatic movements like the front crawl. She also performed the Twist, The Frug, and the Watusi.

On June 19, 1964, when Doda was 26 years old, the Condor's publicist, "Big" Davy Rosenberg gave Doda a "monokini" topless swimsuit designed by Rudi Gernreich.  She performed topless that night, the first noted entertainer of the era to do so. The act was an instant success. Two months after she started her semi-nude performances, the rest of San Francisco's Broadway was topless, followed soon after by entertainers across America. Doda became an American cultural icon of the 1960s. She was profiled in Tom Wolfe's 1969 book The Pump House Gang, and appeared that same year as Sally Silicone in Head, the 1968 film created by Jack Nicholson and Bob Rafelson, and featuring The Monkees. The movie was produced by Columbia Pictures. She also appeared in a Golden Boy parody with Annette Funicello, Sonny Liston, and Davy Jones.

Encouraged by her success, Doda soon decided to enlarge her breasts with silicone injections, going from size 34 to 44. Doda became renowned for her bigger bust, and was one of the first well-known performers to have her breasts artificially enlarged.

For the topless and waterless Swim, Doda wore the bottom half of a black bikini and a net top which ended where a bathing suit generally began. She performed 12 shows nightly so the management could keep crowds moving in and out. A large illuminated sign in front of the club featured a cartoon of her with red flashing lights representing her nipples.

Bottomless entertainer

On September 3, 1969, Carol Doda began dancing bottomless (i.e., totally nude) at the Condor. She danced bottomless until the California Alcoholic Beverages Commission passed a rule in the autumn of 1972 prohibiting nude dancing in places that served alcohol.

In 1969, Doda performed with The TAC squad, a bottomless all-girl band at Carol Doda's at 430 Broadway in San Francisco.

Court appearances 

On April 22, 1965 Doda was arrested along with Pete Mattioli and Gino del Prete, owners of the Condor Club. They were cleared when two judges instructed not-guilty verdicts. Judge Friedman's memorandum to opposing attorneys reads, "Whether acts ... are lewd and dissolute depends not on any individual's interpretation or personal opinion, but on the consensus of the entire community..." Doda and del Prete were arrested during police raids to stop bare-bosom shows in North Beach. Peter Mattioli owned the Condor Club by 1967 and Doda still appeared in shows there.

In 1969, Doda was a witness during the trial of two all-nude dancers who were arrested for "indecent exposure and lewd and dissolute conduct". The defendants were dancers at the Pink Pussy Kat in Orangevale, California. Presiding Municipal Court Judge Earl Warren Jr. moved the trial, temporarily, from the courtroom to Chuck Landis Largo club. There, Doda performed to live song and dance numbers, along with a movie titled Guru You. She was cross-examined by a deputy district attorney about what she hoped to convey to audiences in her act. Doda was dressed in a red miniskirt with dark blue piping and beige boots. She responded that the movie represents "a satire of pornography... it's to show people the humorous side of sex". Several members of the 10-man, 2-woman jury kept in check their smiles as Doda explained the 17-minute movie. The deputy district attorney opposed asking her to perform, considering it irrelevant to the case. He was overruled by Warren.

Later career
From the late-1960s through the late-1970s, Doda was the spokesmodel for what is now the San Jose, California television station KICU-TV Channel 36, then known as KGSC-TV.  Filmed from the waist up and wearing clothes which amplified her most prominent physical attributes, she became known for saying "You're watching the Perfect 36 in San Jose."  She would also occasionally appear on-air to do a double entendre laced editorial commentary on the issues of the day.

Doda appeared as Sadie Thompson in "Rain", at the Encore Theater SF, beginning January 1968.

In 1982 Doda was again dancing at the Condor three times a night. She was 45 and performed to rock 'n' roll, blues, and ragtime. Each act was the same, with Doda appearing in a gold gown, traditional elbow-length gloves, and a diaphanous wraparound. Her clothing was removed until she wore only a g-string and the diaphanous wraparound. In the final portion she was attired in only the wraparound. Her small body looked slimmer without clothes, a perception which was emphasized by the dwarfing effect of her breasts. At the time she was taking dance and voice lessons but had no definite plans for her future. Doda quit in December 1985.

During the 1980s, Doda performed throughout Bay Area dance night clubs with her band The Lucky Stiffs.

Doda retired from stripping in the 1980s and subsequently ran Carol Doda's Champagne and Lace Lingerie Boutique, a lingerie shop in San Francisco.

Throughout the 2000s and early 2010s, Doda performed fully clothed at several San Francisco North Beach bars and clubs, including Gino & Carlo, Amante's, and Enrico's Supper Club.

Personal life
On November 9, 2015, Doda died of kidney failure at St. Luke's Hospital in San Francisco after a long stay. Doda said she was never married. While very young, she gave birth to two children with whom she had little contact: daughter Donna Smith Terzian, who predeceased her, and son Tom Smith.

Recognition
In Yosemite National Park, Doda Dome was named for her.

Filmography
 Head (1968)
 Machine Gun McCain (1969)
 Honky Tonk Nights (1978)

References

External links 
 
 
 Carol Doda interviewed by Herbert Feinstein for [KPFA] 1968-01-25
 "Herbert Feinstein talks with Carol Doda, former topless queen of North Beach, who is starring as Miss Sadie Thompson in a play based on W. Somerset Maugham's short story "Rain." Doda discusses her past (including silicone injections) and her future plans for non-topless nightclub work."

1937 births
2015 deaths
American erotic dancers
American female erotic dancers
Deaths from kidney failure
People from San Francisco
People from Vallejo, California
21st-century American women